Captain January is a 1936 American musical comedy-drama film directed by David Butler. The screenplay by Sam Hellman, Gladys Lehman, and Harry Tugend is based on the 1890 children's book of the same name by Laura E. Richards. The film stars Shirley Temple, Guy Kibbee, and Sara Haden.

There was a tentative renewal, but the film is in the public domain due to "a legal loophole".

Plot
Kindly lighthouse keeper, Captain January, has been raising and educating Star, a sweet, eight-year-old girl he rescued after her parents drowned at sea when she was a baby. He is helped by his two friends, Captain Nazro and Paul Roberts, a mariner. Truant officer Agatha Morgan determines that Star's home schooling is inadequate. Star is then tested and admitted to the third grade. Meanwhile, Mrs. Croft, a friendly widow, has been attempting to woo Captain January.

Nazro receives a notice that all lighthouses are being fully automated by the end of the month, displacing lighthouse keepers. Knowing that January will be unable to support Star, Nazro writes to George Mason, who he believes may be Star's uncle. January is devastated over losing his job, while Nazro grows concerned that his letter to Mr. Mason goes unanswered, knowing Morgan will place Star in an orphanage. January is furious to learn Nazro has contacted Mr. Mason and vows never to give up Star.

Soon after, Nazro arrives and warns January that Morgan is coming to take Star. January and Star hide out on Nazro's boat, but the authorities soon find them and Star is taken. A court hearing is scheduled, but Star's aunt and uncle, who have been out of the country for several years, arrive and assume custody of their niece.

The wealthy Masons provide Star a happy and privileged life, but she deeply misses January. Mr. and Mrs. Mason take Star to see their new yacht. Star is ecstatic to discover that January is the captain, Nazro the first mate, and Paul the deckhand. To January's surprise, Mrs. Croft is the cook.

Cast
 Shirley Temple  as Helen 'Star' Mason, an 8-year-old girl who is a foundling rescued from the sea by Capt. January
 Guy Kibbee as Captain January, the lighthouse keeper at Cape Tempest, Maine
 Slim Summerville as Captain Nazro, January's friend
 Buddy Ebsen as Paul Roberts, January's friend
 Sara Haden as Agatha Morgan, a stern truant officer
 June Lang as Mary, a young, kindhearted schoolteacher
 Jane Darwell as Mrs. Eliza Croft, a widow smitten with Capt. January
 Jerry Tucker as Cyril Morgan a 10-year-old boy
 George Irving as John Mason, Star's uncle
 Nella Walker as Mrs. Mason, Star's aunt
 Si Jenks as Old Sailor

Production
The movie was the first to use the new sound stage 20th Century Fox dedicated to Will Rogers in 1935. Temple learned her multiplication tables while doing the tap dance sequence down the spiral staircase. There were two notable animal rights abuses on the set during the making of this movie. In the famous Codfish Ball sequence, real lobsters were used on the set as a prop but were deemed potentially hazardous and were cooked and repainted their natural red color. In another scene, a live crane was brought in. The bird kept pecking at Temple's eyes, however and as a way of solving this problem, nails were driven through the webbing of the crane's feet, anchoring it to the ground. The bird mimicked movements from its trainer to achieve the dancing effect and was rewarded with fish when the movements were followed correctly.

Temple performed unintentional ad-lib during a scene with co-stars Kibbee and Summerville as they burlesqued the sextette from Lucia. Temple struggled to hit the high notes needed during the musical number and shooting was about to be halted when Template found a note she was unable to reach. She conveyed frustration and proclaimed "it's too high, too high" in timing with the music, before continuing once the notes dropped back to a range she could handle. Director David Butler liked the naturalness of the scene and felt this was more preferable than a perfect rendition and accepted the take without any changes.

In a scene with Buddy Ebsen near the water, Shirley was originally bare-chested. However, complaints from a woman's organization led to the scene being remade with Shirley wearing a top.

See also
 Shirley Temple filmography

References
Footnotes

Works cited

External links
 
 
 
 
 Captain January, color
 Captain January, black & white
 

1936 films
American black-and-white films
Films directed by David Butler
20th Century Fox films
American musical comedy-drama films
1930s musical comedy-drama films
Films based on children's books
Films set in Maine
Films about orphans
Articles containing video clips
Works set in lighthouses
1936 comedy films
1936 drama films
1930s English-language films
1930s American films